Kong Xiangrui (born 18 January 2001) is a Chinese freestyle skier. He competed in the 2018 Winter Olympics.

References

2001 births
Living people
Freestyle skiers at the 2018 Winter Olympics
Chinese male freestyle skiers
Olympic freestyle skiers of China